Carcina quercana is a species of moth of the family Depressariidae. It is found in Europe. It has been introduced recently in North America, British Columbia and western Washington. It is occasionally known by several common names including oak lantern, long-horned flat-body, and oak-skeletonizer moth (the last most common in North America).

The wingspan is 16–20 mm. The forewings are light ochreous, more or less purple-tinged, sprinkled with dark fuscous; costal edge purple; a yellow blotch along costa near base, and another beyond middle; a fuscous transverse line at 1/4, followed by a yellowish suffusion towards dorsum; stigmata dark grey, plical usually faint; a terminal purple line; cilia bright yellow except on tornus. Hindwings are yellow-whitish, apex rosy-tinged. The larva is pale green; dorsal line darker, paler -edged; head yellowish-green,

The larvae feed on various deciduous trees, including oak and beech.

References

External links
 Carcina quercana at UKmoths
 Lepiforum.de

Peleopodinae
Moths described in 1775
Moths of Europe
Moths of North America
Moths of Asia
Taxa named by Johan Christian Fabricius